Dirina candida is a species of saxicolous (rock-dwelling), crustose lichen in the family Roccellaceae. It is found in the southern Mediterranean Basin, with a range extending east to Egypt and Libya. It grows on calcareous rocks that are close to the sea. The lichen was formally described as a new species in 1885 by Johannes Müller Argoviensis from specimens collected in Alexandria, Egypt. Anders Teher and Damien Ertz transferred it to Dirina in 2013. Tehler had previously (1983) referred this species to Dirina immersa, but later molecular phylogenetic analysis revealed that it should instead be considered a distinct species, despite the two sharing the same appearance, morphology, and chemistry.

References

candida
Lichen species
Lichens described in 1885
Taxa named by Johannes Müller Argoviensis
Lichens of North Africa
Lichens of Southwestern Europe